The Princess Mouse: A Tale of Finland is a 2003 American children's picture book written by Aaron Shepard and illustrated by Leonid Gore. It was published by Atheneum Books for Young Readers.

Reception
The Princess Mouse received mostly good reviews. Kirkus Reviews found it "Prettily told, with sweet lessons about love and trust, no matter how odd the circumstances. " while Publishers Weekly wrote "Magical events and a moral dilemma give this Finnish tale its staying power." and "Gore's (Sleeping Boy) distinctively angled figures, drawn in pastel on rough paper, deepen the story's folktale feel"  Inis magazine was critical, writing "Perhaps I am being too hard on this book, but I really do not think that this retelling has any particular merits. It is badly written, poorly illustrated and totally uninspiring. As regards the song at the back, I can’t say that I wanted to sing it!" and The Bulletin of the Center for Children's Books asserted "Although there is little tension in the plot, the marital preparations of characters human and rodent are appealingly handled, and the tone of the text itself is successfully humorous." and called it a "cozy adaptation."
Booklist wrote "Shepard's charmingly droll version of a Finnish folktale combines classic elements with unexpected, witty details" and "The jewel-toned art has beautiful luminescence; the elongated, somewhat blocky look of the characters reinforces the fantasy; and the mice are downright irresistible.", the School Library Journal wrote "On the whole, though, this is a pleasant, attractive addition to folklore shelves." while Horn Book found it a "well-told tale"

References

External links

 Book's page on author's website

2003 children's books
American children's books
American picture books
Finnish fairy tales
Children's fiction books
Books about mice and rats
Atheneum Books books